Phaeoscincus is a genus of skinks. Both species are endemic to New Caledonia.

Species
The following 2 species, listed alphabetically by specific name, are recognized as being valid:

Phaeoscincus ouinensis Sadlier, Shea, & Bauer, 2014
Phaeoscincus taomensis Whitaker, Smith, & Bauer, 2014

Nota bene: A binomial authority in parentheses indicates that the species was originally described in a genus other than Phaeoscincus.

References

Phaeoscincus
Lizard genera
Skinks of New Caledonia
Taxa named by Ross Allen Sadlier
Taxa named by Sarah A. Smith
Taxa named by Aaron M. Bauer